Bellevue West High School is a public secondary school located in Bellevue, Nebraska, United States. It had a 2013 enrollment of 1,584 students. The principal is Kevin Rohlfs.  The school's athletic teams are the Thunderbirds, and their school colors are purple, gold and white.  The school's cross-town rival is Bellevue East. 
Bellevue West is accredited by the North Central Association Commission on Accreditation and School Improvement.  The school also serves as an off-campus location for the Omaha, Nebraska, Metropolitan Community College.

Extracurricular activities

Athletics

Boys Athletics 

 Fall: Football, Tennis, Cross Country
 Winter: Basketball, Bowling, Swimming & Diving, Wrestling
 Spring: Baseball, Golf, Soccer. Track & Field

Girls Athletics 

 Fall: Cross Country, Golf, Softball, Volleyball
 Winter: Basketball, Bowling, Swimming & Diving
 Spring: Soccer, Track & Field, Tennis

State championships

Non-athletic programs

Music
The school's instrumental music department has four concert bands (Concert, Symphonic, Wind Symphony, and Wind Ensemble), two jazz bands, and a marching band.  The school's vocal music department consists of three main choirs (Concert Choir, Arie Armonie, and West High Singers) as well as a show choir (West Connection), a contemporary a cappella group (Project 424) and other small ensembles.

Notable alumni

 Mike Slaton, NFL player for the Minnesota Vikings
 Erick Strickland, professional basketball player, class of 1992
 Thakoon Panichgul, Thai-American fashion designer, class of 1993 
 Mark Traynowicz, NFL player for the Buffalo Bills and Arizona Cardinals

References

External links
 Bellevue West H.S.

Buildings and structures in Bellevue, Nebraska
Educational institutions established in 1977
Public high schools in Nebraska
Schools in Sarpy County, Nebraska
1977 establishments in Nebraska